Stonemouth is a 2012 novel by Scottish author Iain Banks. The novel was published on 5 April 2012 by Little, Brown and Company and follows a man returning to a small seaport town after leaving because of a sexual scandal. The Irish Times picked the book as one of their "Books to Read in 2012".

Plot summary
Stewart Gilmour returns to Stonemouth, a fictional seaport town north of Aberdeen, for a funeral. It is five years since he ran away to London after a sexual indiscretion at a wedding. Stonemouth is controlled by two rival gangs, the Murstons and the MacAvetts, and Gilmour was engaged to a member of the former clan before he had to leave.

Reception
Critical reception for Stonemouth was mostly positive. Some criticisms of the book included some of the references to modern technology being "unauthentic", while praise for the novel centred on the plot's mystery.

Adaptation 

An adaptation for BBC Television was announced in 2014, starring Christian Cooke as Stewart Gilmour, with Peter Mullan, Sharon Small and Gary Lewis. Location filming took place in Macduff, Aberdeenshire in November 2014. It premiered on 8 June 2015 on BBC One Scotland, and 11 June 2015 on BBC Two in the rest of the UK.

References

2012 British novels
British mystery novels
Little, Brown and Company books
Novels by Iain Banks
Novels set in Aberdeenshire
Scottish crime novels
Scottish novels